The Oak Park School District is a school district headquartered in Oak Park, Michigan in Metro Detroit. The district serves most of Oak Park, portions of Southfield, and half of Royal Oak Township.

In 1960 Governor of Michigan G. Mennen Williams consolidated the majority black George Washington Carver School District, along with its elementary school, into the Oak Park School District because the Carver district no longer had sufficient taxes to pay for a senior high school services, and no area school districts voluntarily took its students for high school.

Schools

Secondary schools
Oak Park High School (9-12)
Oak Park Preparatory Academy (6-8)

Elementary schools
Einstein
Key
Pepper

Defunct:
George Washington Carver Elementary School (Royal Oak Township) - Joined in 1960, closed in 1982
 Oak Park Freshman Institute

References

External links

 Oak Park School District

School districts in Michigan
Education in Oakland County, Michigan
Southfield, Michigan